Ceres Futebol Clube, usually known simply as Ceres, is a Brazilian football team from the city of Rio de Janeiro, Rio de Janeiro state, founded on July 10, 1933.

History
On July 10, 1933, Ceres Futebol Clube was founded by sailors of the First Naval District (Primeiro Distrito Naval), who lived at Ceres Street, in Bangu neighborhood.

Titles
Campeonato Carioca Terceira Divisão: 1990
 Departamento Autônomo: 1985
(Departamento Autônomo was the name for the Amateur Carioca Soccer Championship)

Stadium
The home stadium Estádio João Francisco dos Santos has a capacity of 3,000 people.

Colors
The official colors are blue and white.

References

External links
 Ceres FC (official website)
 Ceres/RJ, Futebol Nacional, 2013-03-14.

Association football clubs established in 1933
Football clubs in Rio de Janeiro (state)
Football clubs in Rio de Janeiro (city)
1933 establishments in Brazil